Pteleum or Pteleon was a town of Triphylia, in ancient Elis. Homer writes that it belonged to Nestor in the Catalogue of Ships in the Iliad. It is said by Strabo to have been a colony from the Thessalian Pteleum. This town had disappeared in Strabo's time (first century CE); but its uninhabited woody site was still called Pteleasimum or Pteleasion.

Its site has not been located.

References

Populated places in ancient Elis
Former populated places in Greece
Locations in the Iliad
Thessalian colonies
Lost ancient cities and towns